Habrovany may refer to places in the Czech Republic:

Habrovany (Ústí nad Labem District), a municipality and village in the Ústí nad Labem Region
Habrovany (Vyškov District), a municipality and village in the South Moravian Region